The Very Best of East Seventeen is a greatest hits album from 1990s boy band East 17. The album was released on 31 January 2005.

Track listing
"House of Love"  from Walthamstow 
"Deep"  from Walthamstow 
"It's Alright"  from Walthamstow 
"Stay Another Day"  from Steam 
"Steam"  from Steam 
"Let It Rain"  from Steam 
"Slow It Down"  from Walthamstow 
"If You Ever" (featuring Gabrielle)  from Around the World Hit Singles: The Journey So Far 
"West End Girls"  from Walthamstow 
"Around The World"  from Steam 
"Thunder"  from Up All Night 
"Gold"  from Walthamstow 
"Do U Still"  from Up All Night 
"Someone To Love"  from Up All Night 
"Hey Child"  from Around the World Hit Singles: The Journey So Far 
"Hold My Body Tight"  from Steam 
"Each Time"  from Resurrection 
"Betcha Can’t Wait"  from Resurrection

Charts

References

East 17 compilation albums
2005 greatest hits albums